Aspinoceras is an extinct genus of heteromorph ammonites that lived during the Early Cretaceous.  The shell small; starts off with a few loosely wound whorls not in contact followed by a short moderately curved shaft ending in a broad hook. Surface covered with mostly fine, close spaced ribs, with periodic larger ribs. In general form it resembles Ancyloceras.

Aspinoceras has been found in upper Hauterivian - lower Barremian formations in Europe and California.

References

 

Ancyloceratoidea
Ammonitida genera
Early Cretaceous ammonites of North America